Kimba is a Payams Located in Morobo County, South Sudan bordering the DR Congo and Uganda.

Bomas of Kimba 
Kimba Payam is having four Bomas which are then subdivided into villages 
 Kaya Boma
 Kimba Boma
Yondu Boma

Schools in Kimba Payam 

 kaya primary school
 yondu primary school 
 dodolabe  primary  school
 kimba primary school

Markets  in kimba  payam 

 kimba market
 yondu market
 kaya  market

References 

Central Equatoria